The variegated mogurnda (Mogurnda variegata) is a species of fish in the family Eleotridae endemic to Lake Kutubu, Papua New Guinea.

References

Mogurnda
Freshwater fish of Papua New Guinea
Taxonomy articles created by Polbot
Fish described in 1951